Maujampur is a village in Jagat block, Budaun district, Uttar Pradesh, India. The village is administrated by Gram Panchayat.

References

Villages in Budaun district